Mike Amyx is the incumbent member of the Kansas House of Representatives for the 45th district, which covers Northwestern Douglas County, including western Lawrence. He has served since 2019. He is a member of the Democratic Party. He had previously been the mayor of Lawrence for six terms, 1985–86, 1987–88, 2006–07, 2010–11, 2014–15, and 2015–17. He served a four-year term as a Douglas County Commissioner.

2019-2020 Kansas House committee assignments 
Local Government
General Government Budget
Higher Education Budget (2020)

References

Living people
Year of birth missing (living people)
Place of birth missing (living people)
Democratic Party members of the Kansas House of Representatives
Mayors of places in Kansas
County commissioners in Kansas
21st-century American politicians